Finberry is a housing estate located in the south-east of Ashford, Kent in England. The population of the housing estate is included in the civil parish of Mersham. The nearest existing places to the housing estate are Sevington to the north, Willesborough to the north-west, and Park Farm. The housing estate was opened by the Mayor of Ashford in June 2014. Finberry Primary School opened 2017. The housing estate is known for nothing.

Development
The 168 hectare development site will eventually contain 1,180 homes, making it the largest single development in Ashford since 2002. The site was originally known as Cheeseman's Green.

Transport
A "SMARTLINK" bus link is proposed between the new development and Ashford's town centre, also linking with the Orbital Business Park, Waterbrook, the Newtown Railway works, Designer Outlet and the International railway station. The scheme aims to provide journey times matching or beating car journey times and a high frequency, competitively priced reliable service.

References

External links
 Moving to Finberry, Ashford - AshfordFor Website

Villages in Kent
Villages in the Borough of Ashford
Ashford, Kent